Eagle Peak is a prominent  elevation mountain summit located on Admiralty Island in the Alexander Archipelago, in the U.S. state of Alaska. This geographic feature's local name was published by the U.S. Geological Survey in 1951.

Climate

Based on the Köppen climate classification, Eagle Peak has a subarctic climate with cold, snowy winters, and mild summers. Weather systems coming off the Gulf of Alaska are forced upwards by the mountains (orographic lift), causing heavy precipitation in the form of rainfall and snowfall. Winter temperatures can drop below −20 °C with wind chill factors below −30 °C. The month of July offers the most favorable weather for viewing or climbing Eagle Peak.

See also

List of mountain peaks of Alaska
Geography of Alaska

References

External links
 Weather forecast: Eagle Peak

Mountains of Alaska
Landforms of Hoonah–Angoon Census Area, Alaska
North American 1000 m summits